Shree Durbar (aka Shri Durbar) is a Rana palace in Kathmandu, Patan, Nepal the capital of Nepal. The palace complex, located east of the Lazimpat Durbar next to Patan Dhoka, was incorporated in an impressive and vast array of courtyards, gardens and buildings. Sri Durbar was built by Chandra Shumsher JBR in 1927.

History

Shree Durbar was built by Chandra Shumsher JBR for his youngest wife Bal Kumari Devi and his other sons General Madan Shumsher JBR and Vishnu Shumsher. After Chandra Shumsher's death in 1929, his wife Balkumari Devi left Nepal for Varanashi granting all her property to Madan and Vishnu. Vishnu Shumsher also left Nepal for UK and then US without permission from Primer Bhim Shumsher Jung Bahadur Rana. Eventually possession of Sri Durbar and all its land came to Madan Shumsher JBR and his wife Jagadamba Kumari Devi. After Madan Shumsher's death, his sons Gopal Shumsher and brothers came into possession of this palace.

Current Status

A large part of Shree Durbar's land was sold, donated in Charity and given as alms by Madan Shumsher's wife Jagadamba Kumari Devi throughout her life. Today the main building of Sri Durbar is occupied by descendants of Madan Shumsher JBR but the larger compound has been sold and is now turned into a neighborhood of Sri Durbar Tole along with Madan Puraskar Pustakalaya.

See also
Rana palaces of Nepal
Madan Puraskar Pustakalaya
Jagadamba Kumari Devi

References

Palaces in Kathmandu
Rana palaces of Nepal